Takaki (written:  or ) is a Japanese surname. Notable people with the surname include:

, Japanese footballer
, Japanese sailor
, Japanese footballer
, Japanese physician
, Japanese volleyball player
Ronald Takaki (1939–2009), American historian
, Japanese politician
, Japanese Idol 

Takaki (written:  or ) is also a masculine Japanese given name. Notable people with the name include:

 (born 1983), Japanese footballer

See also
Takagi, another Japanese surname written with the same kanji
Takaki Bakery, a bakery in Hiroshima, Japan
Takaki Promontory, a promontory in Antarctica
Takaaki, a masculine Japanese given name

Japanese-language surnames
Japanese masculine given names